The 2004 European Winter Throwing Challenge was held on 13 and 14 March at St. John Athletic Stadium in Marsa, Malta. It was the fourth edition of the athletics competition for throwing events organised by the European Athletics Association. The 2004 event was the last to use the challenge name, as subsequent editions were known as European Cup Winter Throwing events. A total of 147 athletes from 28 countries entered the competition.

The competition featured men's and women's contests in shot put, discus throw, javelin throw and hammer throw. Athletes were seeded into "A" and "B" groups in each competition. Russia topped the points table in the women's and men's division of the team competition. With four medals, it shared the greatest medal haul alongside Germany, which was runner-up in the points table but was the only nation to have two winners from the eight events on offer.

The host nation, Malta, had only one athlete at the event – men's javelin thrower Jean Paul Callus. The weather was not conducive to high standard performances and Callus gave the sole record performance of the challenge.

Five athletes went on to take medals at the 2004 Athens Olympics: Eşref Apak was a bronze medallist, Vadims Vasiļevskis, Nadine Kleinert and Steffi Nerius took Olympic silver, and Natalya Sadova became the Olympic champion in women's discus. Despite going on to this success, among these only Vasiļevskis was a winner in the European Winter Throwing Challenge.

Medal summary

Men

Women

Medal and points table

Team points given for nations with at least three athletes in a gender category

Participation

References

Results
4th European Cup Winter Throwing Results. RFEA. Retrieved on 2013-11-16.
Euro Chall  Marsa  MLT  13 - 14 March. Tilastopaja. Retrieved on 2013-11-16.

European Throwing Cup
European Cup Winter Throwing
Athletics in Malta
2004 in European sport
European Cup Winter Throwing
2004 in Malta